David J. Schneider is an American psychologist. He is a professor of psychology and the director of the cognitive sciences program at Rice University.

Career and work
Schneider's most important published work deals chiefly with cognitive psychology and organizational psychology, especially bias, prejudice, and discrimination.

Schneider received his Bachelor of Arts degree in philosophy and psychology cum laude from Wabash College in 1962, and his Ph.D. in  social psychology in 1966 from Stanford University. Positions held include:

Assistant Professor, Amherst College, 1966-1971
Visiting assistant professor, Stanford University, 1970–71
Associate Professor, Brandeis University, 1971-1975
Associate Professor, University of Texas at San Antonio, 1975-1978
Professor, University of Texas at San Antonio, 1978-1988
Visiting associate professor, Stanford University, 1978
Visiting professor, Indiana University, 1987-1988
Professor, Rice University, 1989–present, chair, Psychology Department 1990-1996

External links
Official website

21st-century American psychologists
Amherst College faculty
Wabash College alumni
Stanford University alumni
Brandeis University faculty
University of Texas at San Antonio faculty
Indiana University staff
Rice University faculty
Living people
Year of birth missing (living people)